This list charts the most successful films at cinemas in the United Kingdom by box office sales, in pounds sterling and admissions. An overview of the top-earning films and record-holders is provided, as well as the highest-grossing British productions, the most successful non-English-language films and the sound films that have generated the most admissions. A summary of the most popular films over the course of the last century is also included.

American productions dominate, with all films earning over £50 million at the box office either completely or partly produced by Hollywood studios. British film is well represented, with about half the films on the list qualifying as British productions; however, due to the globalization of the film industry most successful British productions since the start of the twenty-first century have been co-produced with other countries. While there is no universally accepted definition of a film's nationality, a legal definition for the Britishness of a film has existed in UK law since 2007, and this is the criteria used here. For films made prior to 2007, the nationalities listed by the sources supplying the data are used where they are given.

The 2015 Star Wars film, The Force Awakens, is the highest-grossing film in terms of nominal box-office sales. The effects of inflation are a significant contributing factor to recent films surpassing the box-office records of older films, so when considering the number of admissions Gone with the Wind (1940) is the most successful film, although this was achieved over several release cycles prior to the home video era.

Highest-grossing films by box-office revenue

Top earning films
The highest earners at the box-office are mostly American films and UK-US co-productions. Sequels, remakes and adaptations dominate, with seven films in the Harry Potter franchise, five Star Wars instalments, the five Daniel Craig James Bond films, five films in the Marvel Cinematic Universe and Peter Jackson's first four Tolkien adaptations having earned in excess of £50 million. This table only charts films released since 1989, but due to inflation it is unlikely anything released prior to then will surpass the films on the list in nominal terms.

Record-holders
As many as fifteen films may have held the record of "highest-grossing film" in Post-war Britain. Emerging from the Second World War in 1945, Gone with the Wind is generally accepted to have been the record-holder, retaining the top spot until 1962 when it was surpassed by South Pacific. South Pacific was comprehensively beaten four years later in 1966 by another musical, The Sound of Music, which trebled the earnings of its predecessor.<ref name=Hall>{{cite book |last=Hall |first=Sheldon |chapter=The Sound of Music |pages=26–28|editor-last1=Williams |editor-first1=Linda Ruth |editor-last2=Hammond |editor-first2=Michael |title=Contemporary American Cinema |year=2006 |publisher=McGraw-Hill |isbn=9780335218318 |quote=In Britain it opened in March 1965 and remained in continuous circulation until 1969. By December 1965, when it had been shown in only seventeen pre-release engagements in London and key cities, it had grossed £1,925,869 from 6,926,825 admissions [Kine. Weekly, 16 December 1965: 151]. A year later it had broken South Pacific'''s record of £2,300,000, which had been amassed over seven years of release, for the highest gross received by any film shown in Britain, with an estimated 21 million admissions to date ... As a result, it was named by Kine. Weekly top UK money-maker for four years in succession, from 1965 to 1968.}}</ref> Regular tracking of box-office performance only started in 1975, so it is only possible to chart the transition of the record with any serious degree of accuracy within this period. It is possible that some of the earlier films in the chart did not surpass the box office of The Sound of Music, and it may have retained the record until the release of E.T. the Extra-Terrestrial. Skyfall, the twenty-third James Bond film in the long-running Eon series, became the first film to gross over £100 million in setting a new record at the box office. All the record-holders since tracking began have been either partially or fully produced by Americans, although The Full Monty, Mamma Mia!, Skyfall and Star Wars: The Force Awakens were UK–US collaborations. Only the grosses that set records are included in the timeline; earnings from subsequent re-releases after the film conceded the record are omitted.

British productions
The Cultural Test for Film, High-end Television and Video Games Regulations, was introduced under the Finance Act 2006 and came into force on January 1, 2007. The regulations set out a points-based system to determine whether a film, high-end television programme or video game qualifies as a "British film" or "British programme" and is therefore eligible for UK tax relief. This was done as an official bilateral co-production agreement or under the European Convention on Cinematographic Co-production.

The cultural test utilises a points-based system which takes account of cultural content, creative elements and heritage, the nationality of the cast and crew and where the bulk of the production takes place. The application of this process can draw to counter-intuitive conclusions; films not classified as British under this system may have British elements, such as being based on books by British authors and featuring British actors—as was the case with The Hobbit trilogy—while films that are regarded as quintessentially American—such as Star Wars: The Force Awakens or The Dark Knight—can result in being classified as British.

The most successful British productions in the modern marketplace generally have American investment, with The King's Speech and The Inbetweeners Movie the only fully British films to have earned in excess of £40 million. Sequels, remakes and adaptations still dominate; the remaining films—with the exception of The Full Monty—are biographical or based on historical events. The King's Speech replaces Star Wars: The Force Awakens as the most successful British production if the criterion is restricted to solely British-produced films.

Non-English-language films
The South Korean film Parasite, winner in the Best Film Not in the English Language category at the 73rd British Academy Film Awards, is the highest-grossing non-English-language film. Chinese and Spanish films are the most represented among high performers in the twenty-first century, with three entries apiece among the top ten non-English-language films. Mel Gibson has directed two films—both featuring dead languages—in the top ten, with The Passion of the Christ in second place and Apocalypto at fifth.

Highest-grossing films by box-office admissions
Up to and including 2003, the British Film Institute (BFI) estimate fifty-two sound films have generated over 10 million admissions. The European Audiovisual Observatory (LUMIERE) have been tracking UK admissions since 1996, and they estimate that twenty-two films have generated over 10 million admissions in that period. Due to conflicting estimates, both sets of figures are presented together here in chronological order. While the two datasets are generally consistent with each other, the estimates from LUMIERE are on average slightly lower than those from the BFI, leading to Bridget Jones's Diary being included in the BFI dataset but excluded from the LUMIERE one. The largest discrepancy is in the estimates for Harry Potter and the Philosopher's Stone; there is a difference of 5 million admissions, but LUMIERE do not include any UK data for 2002 while they do for other countries, which may explain the shortfall.

Re-releases also exacerbate the differences in some cases: both Star Wars Episode I and Titanic were successfully re-released in 2012, and while the LUMIERE dataset includes admissions from the reissues the BFI chart does not. While The Lion King did not generate 10 million admissions during its original release, it may have accumulated 10 million admissions due to a re-release: according to the BFI it had generated over 8 million admissions during its first run in 1994, and LUMIERE estimate it generated another 2 million with its 2011 reissue. If Bridget Jones and The Lion King are included, sixty-seven sound films in total have generated over 10 million admissions at UK cinemas.

Most popular films

Overview of the twentieth century
In 2004, the British Film Institute published a list charting sound films that generated the most admissions at cinemas in the United Kingdom. The list is reproduced here ranking the top fifty films released in the UK throughout the twentieth century, defined as covering the period from 1 January 1901 until 31 December 2000. The later films that appear on the BFI list—2001 onwards—are omitted from this chart for the purpose of providing an overview of the century. The second table ranks British sound productions from the twentieth century, five of which are co-productions with other countries.

Market conditions, industry practices, demographic and cultural shifts have all impacted on cinema attendance throughout the century. Cinemagoing steadily rose during the 1930s with the arrival of sound and peaked in the 1940s, with 1946 setting a record of over 1,635 million annual admissions; roughly equivalent to thirty visits to the cinema per capita. Attendance dropped off after the Second World War, mainly due to the rising popularity of television. The decline of the cinema was compounded by the rise of home video in the 1980s and reached an all-time low of 54 million admissions in 1984. With declining attendance came the closure of many cinemas; a trend that was not reversed until the birth of the multiplex in the late 1980s, with annual cinema admissions climbing back up to around 176 million in 2002. As expected, the 1940s—when cinema attendance was at an all-time high—is the most represented decade on the chart accounting for nearly a third of all entries, while the 1980s—when attendance was at its lowest—is the least represented post-war decade. However, the disparity between the two extremes is not as great as the overall attendance figures suggest due to the fact that vastly more titles were distributed in the 1940s.

When comparing the films in the chart, several trends emerge. British films account for half the entries during the 1940s—as opposed to just one entry in the last twenty years of the century—due in part to the British government imposing quota caps on foreign features, as well as the inherent difficulties in importing films during the Second World War. With so many men away on national service, films that performed well were also heavily skewed toward female audiences, exemplified by no fewer than four films headlined by Anna Neagle during this period. Prior to the 1980s when home video became popular, there was also a lot more repeat viewing, with some films during the 1950s and '60s enjoying extended runs—sometimes lasting up to several years—as roadshows. A film's content can also have a prohibitive effect on its success: most films in the chart are either family or children's films, with only two films (The Godfather and A Clockwork Orange) carrying an X rating or its replacement, the 18 classification, denying entry to minors.

Overall, Gone with the Wind has generated the most admissions at the UK box office with 35 million and Spring in Park Lane is the most successful British sound film with 20 million, while 1938's Snow White and the Seven Dwarfs is the oldest film in the chart with 28 million admissions. While the chart does not take into account silent films, 1916's The Battle of the Somme is generally regarded to be the most successful film of the silent era, with over 20 million admissions.

Overview of the twenty-first century
Film series and adaptations have been the highest earners in the twenty-first century, with only two films—Avatar in 2009 and 1917 in 2020—that are not adapted from a pre-existing property or a sequel emerging as the highest-grossing film of the year. Since the British Film Institute does not regularly track admissions, the only complete metric available for assessing a film's success is the box office revenue, and over a period of time inflation of the currency becomes a key factor when comparing the relative success of films. Ticket prices rose rapidly at the beginning of the twenty-first century, with the average cost increasing by over 70 per cent since 2000. To this end it is useful to adjust the box office gross for inflation, so a chart ranking films by the real value of their earnings is provided alongside a chart of the years' biggest films. After recalculating the grosses using the HM Treasury UK GDP deflator, Star Wars: The Force Awakens remains the most successful film of the twenty-first century.

The Harry Potter series is particularly well represented, topping the year on four occasions with two films in the adjusted top ten. The James Bond films and The Lord of the Rings trilogy also have a strong presence, with two films apiece among the top ten, adjusted for inflation, and with two films from the latter series topping the year. The top ten British productions adjusted for inflation are all international co-productions, and—with the exception of Mamma Mia and Beauty and the Beast—are all Star Wars, James Bond and Harry Potter films. If the criterion is restricted to solely British-produced films, The King's Speech'' is the most successful British production.

Notes

References
Sources

Admissions data

External links
 Statistical Yearbook at British Film Institute

United Kingdom
Films, highest-grossing
British film-related lists